The Public Health Act 1961 (c 64) is an Act of the Parliament of the United Kingdom. Together with certain other Acts, it amends and amplifies the Public Health Act 1936.

Section 1
Section 1(2) was repealed by section 78(b) of, and Schedule 3 to, the Public Health (Control of Disease) Act 1984. Section 1(3) was repealed by section 3(1) of, and Part I of Schedule 3 to, the Water Consolidation (Consequential Provisions) Act 1991. Section 1(3) from "and references" onwards was repealed by section 93(1) of, and Part II of Schedule 18 to, the London Government Act 1963.

Section 2
The words "or rural" in section 2(3) were repealed by section 272(1) of, and Schedule 30 to, the Local Government Act 1972.

Section 3
This section from "or save" onwards was repealed by section 93(1) of, and Part II of Schedule 18 to, the London Government Act 1963.

Sections 4 and 5
These sections were repealed by section 133(2) of, and Schedule 7 to, the Building Act 1984.

Section 6
This section was repealed by section 133(2) of, and Schedule 7 to, the Building Act 1984. Section 6(8) was repealed by Part XI of the Schedule to the Statute Law (Repeals) Act 1974.

Sections 7 to 9
These sections were repealed by section 133(2) of, and Schedule 7 to, the Building Act 1984.

Section 10
This section was repealed by section 133(2) of, and Schedule 7 to, the Building Act 1984. Sections 10(1), (3) and (6) were repealed by Part XI of the Schedule to the Statute Law (Repeals) Act 1974.

Section 11
This section was repealed by section 133(2) of, and Schedule 7 to, the Building Act 1984.

Sections 12 to 14
These sections were repealed by section 190(3) of, and Part I of Schedule 27 to, the Water Act 1989.

Section 15
This section was repealed by section 40(3) of, and Schedule 9 to, the Water Act 1973.

Section 16
This section was repealed by section 272(1) of, and Schedule 30 to, the Local Government Act 1972.

Sections 17 and 18
A new section 17 was substituted for sections 17 and 18 by section 27(1) of the Local Government (Miscellaneous Provisions) Act 1982.

Sections 19 to 21
These sections were repealed by section 133(2) of, and Schedule 7 to, the Building Act 1984.

Section 23
This section was repealed by section 133(2) of, and Schedule 7 to, the Building Act 1984.

Section 24
This section was repealed by section 133(2) of, and Schedule 7 to, the Building Act 1984. The words from "and accordingly" onwards in section 24(1) were repealed by Part XI of the Schedule to the Statute Law (Repeals) Act 1974. Section 24(2) was repealed by Part XI of the Schedule to the Statute Law (Repeals) Act 1974.

Section 25
This section was repealed by section 133(2) of, and Schedule 7 to, the Building Act 1984. Section 25(10) was repealed by Part XI of the Schedule to the Statute Law (Repeals) Act 1974.

Sections 26 to 33
These sections were repealed by section 133(2) of, and Schedule 7 to, the Building Act 1984.

Section 34
The words "or waste deposited in accordance with a disposal licence in force under Part I of the Control of Pollution Act 1974" in section 34(5) were repealed by regulation 74(2) of, and Schedule 23 to, the Environmental Permitting (England and Wales) Regulations 2007 (SI 2007/3538).

Sections 38 and 39
These sections were repealed by section 78(b) of, and Schedule 3 to, the Public Health (Control of Disease) Act 1984.

Section 40
This sections was repealed by section 78(b) of, and Schedule 3 to, the Public Health (Control of Disease) Act 1984. The words "on the advice of their medical officer of health" in section 40(2) were repealed by section 272(1) of, and Schedule 30 to, the Local Government Act 1972.

Sections 41 and 42
These sections were repealed by section 78(b) of, and Schedule 3 to, the Public Health (Control of Disease) Act 1984.

Sections 43 and 44
These sections were repealed by section 343(3) of, and Schedule 25 to, the Highways Act 1980.

Sections 46 to 50
These sections were repealed by section 343(3) of, and Schedule 25 to, the Highways Act 1980.

Section 51
This section was repealed by section 12(3) of, and Schedule 2 to, the Litter Act 1983. The proviso to section 51(1) was repealed by section 272(1) of, and Schedule 30 to, the Local Government Act 1972.

Section 52
Section 52(1) from "and section three" onwards was repealed by Part IV of Schedule 1 to the Statute Law (Repeals) Act 1989.

Section 53
Section 53(2) from "and sections three" onwards was repealed by Part IV of Schedule 1 to the Statute Law (Repeals) Act 1989. Section 53(5) was repealed by Part IV of Schedule 1 to the Statute Law (Repeals) Act 1989.

Section 54
Section 54(6) from "and sections three" onwards was repealed by Part IV of Schedule 1 to the Statute Law (Repeals) Act 1989. Section 54(8) repealed by section 272(1) of, and Schedule 30 to, the Local Government Act 1972.

Sections 55 to 57
These sections were repealed by section 108(2) of, and Schedule 4 to, the Control of Pollution Act 1974.

Section 58
This section was repealed by Part XI of the Schedule to the Statute Law (Repeals) Act 1974. This section was also repealed by section 108(2) of, and Schedule 4 to, the Control of Pollution Act 1974.

Section 59
This section was repealed by section 3(1) of, and Part I of Schedule 3 to, the Water Consolidation (Consequential Provisions) Act 1991.

Section 60
This section was repealed by section 3(1) of, and Part I of Schedule 3 to, the Water Consolidation (Consequential Provisions) Act 1991. The words "under subsection (3) of section 2 of the Act of 1937" in section 60(1) were repealed by section 190(3) of, and Part I of Schedule 27 to, the Water Act 1989. Section 60(3) was repealed by section 190(3) of, and Part I of Schedule 27 to, the Water Act 1989.

Section 61
This section was repealed by section 3(1) of, and Part I of Schedule 3 to, the Water Consolidation (Consequential Provisions) Act 1991. The words from "by a direction" to "date, or" in section 60(1), and the words from "or vary" to "against" in section 60(5), were repealed by section 190(3) of, and Part I of Schedule 27 to, the Water Act 1989.

Section 62
This section was repealed by section 3(1) of, and Part I of Schedule 3 to, the Water Consolidation (Consequential Provisions) Act 1991. The words "the Act of 1937 or" in section 62(1) were repealed by section 190(3) of, and Part I of Schedule 27 to, the Water Act 1989.

Section 63
This section was repealed by section 3(1) of, and Part I of Schedule 3 to, the Water Consolidation (Consequential Provisions) Act 1991. Section 63(5) was repealed by section 108(2) of, and Schedule 4 to, the Control of Pollution Act 1974.

Section 64
This section was repealed by section 3(1) of, and Part I of Schedule 3 to, the Water Consolidation (Consequential Provisions) Act 1991.

Section 65
This section was repealed by section 40(3) of, and Schedule 9 to, the Water Act 1973.

Sections 66 to 68
These sections were repealed by section 3(1) of, and Part I of Schedule 3 to, the Water Consolidation (Consequential Provisions) Act 1991.

Section 69
Section 69(1) was repealed by section 3(1) of, and Part I of Schedule 3 to, the Water Consolidation (Consequential Provisions) Act 1991.

Section 70
This section was repealed by section 190(3) of, and Part I of Schedule 27 to, the Water Act 1989.

Section 71
This section was repealed by section 93(1) of, and Part II of Schedule 18 to, the London Government Act 1963.

Section 72
This section was repealed by section 162(2) of, and Part III of Schedule 16 to, the Environmental Protection Act 1990.

Section 75
Section 75(4) was repealed by section 81(1) of, and Schedule 2 to, the Local Government (Miscellaneous Provisions) Act 1976.

Section 76
Section 76(3) was repealed by section 81(1) of, and Schedule 2 to, the Local Government (Miscellaneous Provisions) Act 1976.

Section 78
This section was repealed by section 5(4) of the Water Act 1981.

Section 79
This section was repealed by Part XI of the Schedule to the Statute Law (Repeals) Act 1974. Section 79(2) was repealed by section 93(1) of, and Part II of Schedule 18 to, the London Government Act 1963.

Section 80
This section was repealed by section 81(1) of, and Schedule 2 to, the Local Government (Miscellaneous Provisions) Act 1976.

Section 81
The words "or by the Greater London Council" were repealed by section 102 of, and Schedule 17 to, the Local Government Act 1985.

Section 84
The words from "Subsection (3)" to "to new towns)" in section 84(1) were repealed by section 56(3) of, and Schedule 12 to, the New Towns Act 1965.

Section 86
Section 86(2) was repealed by Part 13 of Schedule 1 to the Statute Law (Repeals) Act 2004. Section 86(3) was repealed by Part XI of the Schedule to the Statute Law (Repeals) Act 1974.

Schedule 1
This Schedule was repealed by section 133(2) of, and Schedule 7 to, the Building Act 1984. The entries relating to the Highways Act 1959 in Part III were repealed by section 343(3) of, and Schedule 25 to, the Highways Act 1980. The words "in the administrative county of London or", the words "in subsection (6) of section thirty-two, and", and the words "to London and" in the last paragraph of the amendments of the Clean Air Act 1956 were repealed by section 93(1) of, and Part II of Schedule 18 to, the London Government Act 1963.

Schedule 2
This Schedule was repealed by section 190(3) of, and Part I of Schedule 27 to, the Water Act 1989.

Schedule 4
The reference to the British Coal Corporation in the Table was repealed by section 67(8) of, and Part IV of Schedule 11 to, the Coal Industry Act 1994. The entry relating to the provision of a universal postal service was repealed by Schedule 2 to the Postal Services Act 2000 (Consequential Modifications) Order 2003 (SI 2003/2908).

Schedule 5
This Schedule was repealed by Part XI of the Schedule to the Statute Law (Repeals) Act 1974.

See also
Public Health Act
UK enterprise law

References
Halsbury's Statutes. Third Edition. Volume 26. Page 500.
Annotated Legislation Service. Volume 130.
Graham Wilson. The Public Health Act, 1961. Butterworth and Company (Publishers) Limited. London. 1962. [Reprint of Butterworths Annotated Legislation Service Statutes Supplement, volume 130].
John Francis Garner. Shaw's Guide to the Public Health Act 1961. Shaw & Sons Ltd. London. 1961. Reviewed at 233 The Law Times 78; The Municipal Review, May 1962, p 337; (1962) 70 The Municipal Journal 375 (9 February); (1962) 59 Law Society's Gazette 276

External links
The Public Health Act  1961, as amended from the National Archives.
The Public Health Act  1961, as originally enacted from the National Archives.

United Kingdom Acts of Parliament 1961